Wycliffe David Toole Jr. (March 14, 1927 - November 24, 2018) was a rear admiral in the United States Navy. He was a former commandant of the Fourth Naval District (1975–1978), First Naval District and Taiwan Patrol Force (1973–1975).

References

United States Navy admirals
1927 births
2018 deaths